King Biscuit may refer to:
 King Biscuit Blues Festival, an annual, multi-day blues festival, held in Helena, Arkansas, United States
 Arkansas Blues and Heritage Festival, the name of the festival from 2005 to 2010
 King Biscuit Boy or Richard Alfred Newell (1944–2003), Canadian blues musician
 King Biscuit Flower Hour, a rock and roll radio show by King Biscuit Entertainment
 King Biscuit Time, a blues radio show broadcast from Helena, Arkansas on KFFA
 King Biscuit Time (musician), a solo project by Scottish musician Steve Mason